C. N. Saliya W. Mathew was the 2nd Governor of Sabaragamuwa. He was appointed in 1993 succeeding Noel Wimalasena and was Chief Minister until 9 June 2005. He was succeeded by Reggie Ranatunga.

References

Governors of Sabaragamuwa Province